Notable people with the surname Groven include:

Alexander Groven (born 1992, né Hassum), Norwegian football defender
Aud Ingebjørg Groven Halvorsen (born 1942), former Norwegian speed skater
Eivind Groven (1901–1977), Norwegian microtonal composer and music-theorist
Rolf Dagfinn Groven (born 1943), Norwegian painter
Sigmund Groven (born 1946), Norwegian classical harmonica player
Tone Alis Groven Holmboe (born 1930), Norwegian composer and teacher